Two ships of the United States Navy have been named Conemaugh after the Conemaugh River in Pennsylvania.

 , launched in 1862 and decommissioned in 1867.
 , commissioned in 1945 and decommissioned in 1946.

Sources
 

United States Navy ship names